St Paul's Anglican School, Bald Hills, commonly known as St Paul's School is an independent Anglican co-educational early learning, primary and secondary day school located in the northern Brisbane suburb of Bald Hills, Queensland, Australia, bordering the Pine River and the Moreton Bay Region.

The school opened on 31 January 1960 and is named after St Paul the Apostle and bears the same name as St Paul's School in London. St. Paul's School offers an academic and technical education as well as a range of co-curricular activities.

Sub-schools 
St Paul's is composed of five sub-schools:

Headmasters and principals

History 

In 1857 the site of the school was first settled by Scottish settlers. In 1859, the British colony of Queensland was founded. In 1886 the original wooden building, the Old Farmhouse, was built. It still stands today. On 13 February 1958 the Church of England acquired the property via a bequest from Sir Edwin Tooth for the "establishment of an all boys grammar school". The school opened on 31 January 1961 with a small staff of three and an enrolment of sixty-four boys between grades eight and twelve. Years later the school expanded its clientele and became fully co-educational. This allowed for a substantial increase in funds, which meant much-needed facilities could be built.

Campus

Location 
The school is situated on the bank of the South Pine River, on the border between the Brisbane City Council and Moreton Bay Regional Council. The area surrounding the school is a mix of residential and rural properties.

Grounds and facilities 

The School occupies a single  campus, which includes both the school's buildings as well as its sporting fields and grazing land. A pair of hoop pines which were originally planted in the 1850s are now heritage-listed.

Many of the buildings on the school campus are 40 years old. More modern facilities include the School Chapel, the Music Centre, the Middle School, the renovated Design/Technology building, the Geise Library and new Science Laboratories. Construction was recently completed on the new Sutton Building, replacing the old building of the same name at the beginning of 2012. It includes the school's first café – Sippers@Suttons as well as English classrooms and the international school.

The original blocks 1 & 2 used for Language classes, Food Technology and Computer Studies of the school is currently under revision and is planned to be demolished in 2022 and replaced by a new building complex. Though when the destruction and construction project will occur as well as the nature and purpose of this new facility is still unknown.

Sports
TAS (The Associated Schools) Sports
The St Paul's Anglican School sporting program is centered on membership of:
 The Associated Schools (TAS) for students in Years 7-12, and
 Junior TAS Competition (JTAS) for students in Years 4-6, the premier co-educational sporting associations of South-East Queensland.

The School participates in TAS & JTAS Saturday Sporting fixtures over 3 trimesters. Each trimester is approximately nine weeks. The School also participates in Interschool Carnivals in Swimming, Cross-country and Athletics.

House system 
Prior to 2017, the St. Paul's School house system consisted of ten secondary school houses and four junior school houses. The secondary school houses were Arnott, Baker, Gartside, Grindrod, Halse, Ivor Church, Stewart, Strong, Sutton, and Tooth, whereas the junior school houses were Rudd, Ingpen, Klein, and Theile. However, in late 2016, it was decided to establish a set of new houses across the entire school, based on elements of the school crest (Shield, Sword, Mitre, Crown, and Scroll) and to abolish the former junior school house system altogether, with Headmaster Browning citing the decrease in the school population as well as arguing that 14 houses were redundant. The new houses are:

Sexual abuse 

In 2003, St Paul's School was the subject of intense public scrutiny after former students stated that they had been abused by Kevin Lynch, a staff member employed at the time. Lynch was employed as a school counsellor at Brisbane Grammar School during the 1970s and 1980s, and subsequently at St Paul's School. The students claimed that they were tortured, hypnotised and required to perform sexual acts for Lynch, and alleged that they had told St Paul's School staff about Lynch's activities, but were ignored. In 1997, shortly after having been charged with the sexual abuse of students at Brisbane Grammar School and St Paul's, Lynch committed suicide.

Notable alumni 

 Michael Butler – 2006 – Lead Guitarist for music group Sheppard
 Joe Dawes – 1987 – Queensland Bulls fast bowler
 Peter Dutton - 1987 – House of Representatives member for Dickson
 Ben Tune – 1993 – Queensland Reds & Australian Wallabies player
 Rod Welford – former Queensland Minister for Education, Training and the Arts, and Attorney-General; former member for the Queensland state electoral district of Everton
 Lee Zahner – 1991 – Sydney 2000 Olympics Australian Beach Volleyball team

See also 

 List of schools in Queensland
 List of Anglican schools in Australia

References

External links 

 St Paul's School website

Anglican primary schools in Brisbane
Anglican high schools in Brisbane
Educational institutions established in 1961
Junior School Heads Association of Australia Member Schools
1961 establishments in Australia
The Associated Schools member schools